Mianyang (绵阳) is a prefecture-level city in Sichuan, China.

Mianyang may also refer to the following locations in China:

Mianyang, Guangdong (棉洋), a town in Wuhua County, Guangdong
Mianyang Subdistrict (勉阳街道), a subdistrict in Mian County, Shaanxi
Xiantao, a city in Hubei, known as Mianyang (沔阳) before 1986